John Jones  is a retired American soccer midfielder who played professionally in the USISL and Major League Soccer.

Youth
Jones graduated from Folsom High School where he scored 37 goals his senior season.  Jones began his collegiate career with American River College in Sacramento, California.  He broke his arm midway through his sophomore season which forced him to sit out the remaining games.  He then transferred to Sacramento State.  He later spent six months with Tahuichi Academy.   Jones also played for PSC Aguias of the Central California Soccer League (CCSL).

Professional
In 1996, Jones turned professional with the expansion Sacramento Scorpions of the USISL.  He was selected as First Team All-USISL.  On February 2, 1997, the Los Angeles Galaxy selected Jones in the second round (nineteenth overall) of the 1997 MLS Supplemental Draft.  He played five games with the Galaxy and another three on loan to the Orange County Zodiac of the USISL A-League.  On July 1, 1997, the Galaxy waived Jones and he signed with the Zodiac on July 17.  In February 1998, the Tampa Bay Mutiny selected Jones in the second round (twenty-fourth overall) of the 1998 MLS Supplemental Draft.  Jones did not enter a first team game before being waived early in the season.  On April 14, 1998, Jones signed with the Charleston Battery.  On May 28, 1998, the Battery traded Jones to the Nashville Metros in exchange for Jeremy Gunn.  He played seventeen games, scoring two goals for the Metros.  On February 7, 1999, the Los Angeles Galaxy again selected Jones, this time in the second round (twenty-second overall) of the 1999 MLS Supplemental Draft.  He played most of the season out on loan, then broke his leg in August.  In 2000 and 2001, he played for the Pittsburgh Riverhounds.  In 2002, he played for the Charleston Battery.  In 2003, he played for the Des Moines Menace of the Premier Development League.  In 2005, he played one game with the Los Angeles Galaxy reserve team.  In 2006, he joined the Vancouver Whitecaps of the USL First Division.

References

External links
 Charleston Battery profile

1973 births
Living people
American soccer players
Charleston Battery players
Des Moines Menace players
LA Galaxy players
Major League Soccer players
Nashville Metros players
Orange County Blue Star players
Pittsburgh Riverhounds SC players
Sacramento Scorpions players
Sacramento State Hornets men's soccer players
Tampa Bay Mutiny players
USL League Two players
Vancouver Whitecaps (1986–2010) players
USISL Select League players
A-League (1995–2004) players
LA Galaxy draft picks
Tampa Bay Mutiny draft picks
People from Folsom, California
Soccer players from California
Association football midfielders